The United Party was a political party in Kenya.

History
The party was established in August 1959 by Llewellyn Briggs, bringing together his Independent Group and former members of the Federal Independence Party (FIP) who had formed the Progressive Local Government Party. The Independent Group had won eight of the fourteen European seats in the 1956 general elections, whilst the FIP had failed to gain representation. The formation of the United Party was primarily a response to the establishment of the New Kenya Party by liberal Europeans.

Opposing independence, integrated education and common-roll elections, the United Party lent its support to the new Kenya Coalition in 1960, and was defunct by the end of the year.

References

Defunct political parties in Kenya
1959 establishments in Kenya
Political parties established in 1959
1960 disestablishments in Kenya
Political parties disestablished in 1960